Galleasses were military ships developed from large merchant galleys, and intended to combine galley speed with the sea-worthiness and artillery of a galleon. While perhaps never quite matching up to their full expectations, galleasses nevertheless remained significant elements in the early modern naval armoury from the 15th to 17th centuries.

Development
Converted for military use, galleasses were higher, larger and slower than regular ("light") galleys. They had up to 32 oars, each worked by up to five men. They usually had three masts, a forecastle and an aftcastle. Much effort was made in Venice to make these galleasses as fast as possible to compete with regular galleys. The gun deck usually ran over the rowers' heads, but there are also pictures showing the opposite arrangement. Galleasses usually carried more sails than true galleys and were far deadlier; a galley caught broadside lay all but helpless, since coming broadside to a galleass, as with a ship of the line, exposed an attacker to her gunfire. Relatively few galleasses were built—one disadvantage was that, being more reliant on sails, their position at the front of the galley line at the start of a battle could not be guaranteed.

Naval actions
Venetian Galleasses were used successfully at the Battle of Lepanto in 1571, their firepower helping to break the force of the first Turkish attack, and eventually helping to win victory for the Holy League fleet.
Four great Naples galleasses were deemed sufficiently seaworthy to accompany the Spanish Armada in 1588 (e.g. La Girona, eventually wrecked off Ireland), where they formed part of the front-line of fighting ships. During the Channel actions, they were repeatedly called on as a squad in any calm, to rescue Spanish stragglers or cut-off a stray English ship. With 50 guns apiece, 300 soldiers and sailors, and 300 rowers, they were formidable ships; but their leader was wrecked after the Calais fire ship attack, (the Battle of Gravelines), and only two of the four made it back safely to Spain.

Later history and parallels
In the 15th century, a type of light galleass, called the frigate, was built in southern European countries to answer the increasing challenge posed by the North African-based Barbary pirates in their fast galleys.

In the Mediterranean, with its less dangerous weather and fickle winds, both galleasses and galleys continued to be in use, particularly in Venice and the Ottoman Empire, long after they became obsolete elsewhere. Later, "round ships" and galleasses were replaced by galleons and ships of the line which originated in Atlantic Europe. The first Venetian ship of the line was built in 1660.

In the North Sea and the western Baltic, the term galeas refers to small commercial vessels similar to a flat-sterned herring buss.

In Maritime Southeast Asia, local kingdoms also built galleasses, although the tactics used were different from those of European vessels. The galley and galleass of Southeast Asia were usually equipped with bow-mounted cannon and side-mounted swivel guns. The soldiers of the Southeast Asian navy customarily fought with boarding actions, so quick-firing side-mounted swivel guns were used to counter this. Acehnese large galleys (galleasses) reached 100 m in length and 17 m in breadth, having 3 masts with square sails and topsails; they were propelled by 35 oars on each side and was able to carry 700 men. They were armed with 98 guns: 18 large cannons (five 55-pounders at the bow, one 25-pounder at the stern, the rest were 17 and 18-pounders), 80 falcons, and many swivel guns. The Portuguese described one they captured in 1629, called the "Espanto do Mundo" (terror of the world), which was probably a translation of "Cakradonya" (Cakra Dunia). It was bigger than anything ever built in the Christian world, and the height of its castle could compete with the height of galleons. There were reported to be a total of 47 of them during Iskandar Muda's reign.

See also

References

External links

Naval sailing ship types
Galleys
Human-powered vehicles